The following is an alphabetical list of articles related to the Commonwealth of the Northern Mariana Islands.

0–9

.mp – Internet country code top-level domain for the Commonwealth of the Northern Mariana Islands

A
Agrihan Island
Aguijan
Airports in the Northern Mariana Islands
Anatahan Island
Area code 670
Asuncion Island
Atlas of the Northern Mariana Islands

B
Battle of Saipan
Battle of Tinian
Birds of the Northern Mariana Islands

C
Capital of the Northern Mariana Islands
Chamorro people
:Category:Chamorro
commons:Category:Chamorro
Cities in the Northern Mariana Islands
Colleges and universities in the Northern Mariana Islands
commons:Category:Universities and colleges in the Northern Mariana Islands
Commonwealth of the Northern Mariana Islands  website
Constitution of the Commonwealth of the Northern Mariana Islands
Government of the Commonwealth of the Northern Mariana Islands
:Category:Government of the Northern Mariana Islands
commons:Category:Government of the Northern Mariana Islands
Supreme Court of the Commonwealth of the Northern Mariana Islands
Commonwealth of the Northern Mariana Islands Public School System
Communications on the Northern Mariana Islands
Constitution of the Commonwealth of the Northern Mariana Islands

D
Demographics of the Northern Mariana Islands
commons:Category:Demographics of the Northern Mariana Islands
Department of Public Safety, Commonwealth of the Northern Mariana Islands

E
Economy of the Northern Mariana Islands
:Category:Economy of the Northern Mariana Islands
Education in the Northern Mariana Islands
Elections in the Northern Mariana Islands
:Category:Elections in the Northern Mariana Islands
Environment of the Northern Mariana Islands

F

Farallon de Medinilla
Farallon de Pajaros
Flag of the Northern Mariana Islands
Freedom Tower Silver Dollar

G
Garapan
Geography of the Northern Mariana Islands
commons:Category:Geography of the Northern Mariana Islands
Government of the Commonwealth of the Northern Mariana Islands  website
Governor of the Commonwealth of the Northern Mariana Islands
List of governors of the Northern Mariana Islands
Guam
Guguan

H
Higher education in the Northern Mariana Islands
History of the Northern Mariana Islands
Historical outline of the Northern Mariana Islands
:Category:History of the Northern Mariana Islands
commons:Category:History of the Northern Mariana Islands

I
Images of the Northern Mariana Islands
Islands of the Northern Mariana Islands
Agrihan Island
Anatahan Island
Asuncion Island
Farallon de Medinilla
Farallon de Pajaros
Guguan
Maug Islands
Pagan Island
Rota
Saipan
Sarigan Island
Tinian
Izu–Bonin–Mariana Arc

J

K

L
Law enforcement in the Northern Mariana Islands
Lists related to the Northern Mariana Islands:
List of airports in the Northern Mariana Islands
List of birds of the Northern Mariana Islands
List of cities in the Northern Mariana Islands
List of colleges and universities in the Northern Mariana Islands
List of islands of the Northern Mariana Islands
List of newspapers in Northern Mariana Islands
List of political parties in the Northern Mariana Islands
List of radio stations in the Northern Mariana Islands
List of Registered Historic Places in the Northern Mariana Islands
List of Superfund sites in the Northern Mariana Islands
List of villages in the Northern Mariana Islands
List of wettest known tropical cyclones in the Northern Mariana Islands

M
Mariana Islands
Mariana Trench
Mariana Trough
Maritime Heritage Trail – Battle of Saipan
Maug Islands
Micronesia
Micronesia Challenge
MP – United States Postal Service postal code for the Commonwealth of the Northern Mariana Islands
Music of the Northern Mariana Islands

N
Newspapers in the Northern Mariana Islands
Northern Mariana Islands  website
:Category:Northern Mariana Islands
commons:Category:Northern Mariana Islands
commons:Category:Maps of Northern Mariana Islands
Northern Marianas College

O

P
Pacific Basin Development Council
People from the Northern Mariana Islands
Politics of the Northern Mariana Islands
List of political parties in the Northern Mariana Islands
:Category:Politics of the Northern Mariana Islands
Public School System of the Commonwealth of the Northern Mariana Islands

Q

R
Radio stations in the Northern Mariana Islands
Registered historic places in the Northern Mariana Islands
commons:Category:Registered Historic Places in the Northern Mariana Islands
Religion in the Northern Mariana Islands
Rota

S

Saipan, capital since 1668
Saipan International Airport
Sarigan Island
Scouting in the Northern Mariana Islands
Seal of the Commonwealth of the Northern Mariana Islands
Superfund sites in the Northern Mariana Islands
Susupe

T
Telephone area code 670
Tenorio, Pedro A.
Topic outline of the Northern Mariana Islands
Tourism in the Northern Mariana Islands  website
Tropical cyclones in the Northern Mariana Islands
:Category:Typhoons in the Northern Mariana Islands

U
United Nations Trust Territories
United States of America
Political divisions of the United States
United States Court of Appeals for the Ninth Circuit
United States District Court for the Northern Mariana Islands
Universities and colleges in the Northern Mariana Islands
commons:Category:Universities and colleges in the Northern Mariana Islands

V
Villages in the Northern Mariana Islands

W
Wikimedia
Wikimedia Commons Atlas of the Northern Mariana Islands
Wikimedia Commons Category:Northern Mariana Islands
commons:Category:Maps of the Northern Mariana Islands
Wikinews:Category:Northern Mariana Islands
Wikipedia Category:Northern Mariana Islands
Wikipedia:WikiProject Micronesia/Northern Mariana Islands work group
Wikipedia:WikiProject Micronesia/Northern Mariana Islands work group#Recognized content
Wikipedia:WikiProject Micronesia/Northern Mariana Islands work group#Participants
Wikipedia:WikiProject Topic outline/Drafts/Topic outline of the Northern Mariana Islands

X

Y

Z

See also

Topic overview:
Northern Mariana Islands
Outline of the Northern Mariana Islands

Carolinian language
Chamorro language

External links

 
Northern Mariana Islands